Into the Labyrinth may refer to: 

In TV:

 Into the Labyrinth (TV series), a 1980s children's TV series
 "Into the Labyrinth" (Andromeda), a sci-fi TV series Andromeda's episode 31/#209

In music:

 Into the Labyrinth (Dead Can Dance album), a 1993 album by Dead Can Dance
 Into the Labyrinth (Saxon album), a 2009 album by Saxon
 "Into the Labyrinth", a Trevor Jones song on the 1986 film Labyrinth soundtrack
 "Into the Labyrinth", a musical composition on Into India by Hildegard Westerkamp

In books:

 Into the Labyrinth (novel), a 1993 fantasy novel by Margaret Weis and Tracy Hickman
 Into the Labyrinth: The United States and the Middle East, 1945-1993, a 1994 history book by H. W. Brands
 Into the Labyrinth, a 2002 young adult fiction by Roderick Townley

In film:
 Into the Labyrinth (film), a 2019 Italian thriller film